Adaina atahualpa is a moth of the family Pterophoridae. It is found in Colombia and Ecuador.

References

Moths described in 2011
Oidaematophorini
Moths of South America
Lepidoptera of Ecuador